Borris House is a country house near Borris, County Carlow.

History 
Borris House is the ancestral home of the McMorrough Kavanagh family.

Births 

 Arthur MacMurrough Kavanagh

References

Bibliography 
 Joyce, Edmund. Borris House, Co. Carlow, and Elite Regency Patronage, Maynooth studies in local history, no. 108. Dublin, Four Courts Press, 2013  
 Murdoch, Tessa (ed.) (2022). Great Irish Households: Inventories from the Long Eighteenth Century. Cambridge: John Adamson, pp. 239–45

See also 

 List of country houses in County Carlow

Buildings and structures in County Carlow
Buildings and structures completed in 1731
Tudor architecture
Houses completed in 1731